Niels Bødker Møller (born 2 November 1939) is a Danish former footballer who played as a midfielder for KFUMs BK Odense and Kjøbenhavns Boldklub. He made 13 appearances for the Denmark national team from 1966 to 1970.

References

External links
 
 

1939 births
Living people
Footballers from Odense
Danish men's footballers
Association football midfielders
Denmark international footballers
Denmark youth international footballers
Denmark under-21 international footballers
Kjøbenhavns Boldklub players